Kurangu Bommai is a 2017 Indian Tamil-language crime thriller film, written and directed by Nithilan Swaminathan. The film stars Vidharth, Delna Davis and Bharathiraja, with Elango Kumaravel and P. L. Thenappan in supporting roles. Featuring music composed by Ajaneesh Loknath and cinematography by Udhayakumar, the film released on 1 September 2017 to positive reviews from film critics. The film was remade in Kannada as Ombattane Dikku.

Plot 

Ekambaram is a don in Thanjavur who smuggles expensive idols and artifacts. Sundaram is a coworker and friend of Ekambaram. Sundaram's son Kathir is a cab driver in Chennai. One day, Kathir goes to a girl named Viji for her hand in marriage, only to be rejected by her father as he learns that Kathir's father works for Ekambaram. Kathir then slaps Viji's father and leaves; however, he still proposes to Viji.

From here on, the movie is narrated in a nonlinear plot. Sindhanai is a pickpocket who suffers from insomnia. An astrologer tells him that he can only be cured when he makes a bed out of 1 Crore rupees and sleeps on top of it. Sindhanai then makes it his life's goal to steal 1 Crore.

Meanwhile, Kathir, who has returned to Chennai, is waiting at a bus stop and sees a middle-aged man carrying a bag with a picture of a monkey on it. Sindhanai, who believes the bag is full of money, steals it and runs away. Kathir chases him and manages to get it back. When he returns to give it back to the man, he is not there. Kathir posts a picture of the bag on Facebook in hopes of the owner contacting him. Later, Kathir bumps into Viji and follows her to the hospital that her father is admitted at to apologize to him, but is insulted. Kathir leaves and forgets the bag. Later that day, Kathir's mother phones him and reveals that his father, who left for Chennai without informing him, has not returned home for two days. Kathir starts to search for him and comes across a woman who has his father's phone, but with no SIM card inside. Kathir informs Viji about the bag that he forgot in the hospital and asks her to keep it safe. However, her father angrily throws the bag from the top of the hospital balcony and into a trash bin below.

The film then flashes back to a few days ago in Thanjavur. One of Ekambaram's henchmen buys this very bag from a shop and uses it for smuggling a golden idol worth 5 Crore from Thanjavur to Chennai. Ekambaram asks Sundaram to complete the task. He has to take it to Chennai and hand it over to a man named Sekar, who is the man who lost the bag at the bus stop. Sundaram goes to Sekar's house and stays there so that Sekar will complete the transaction, exchange the idol with a pawn shop owner, and give the money back to Sundaram.

Back in the present, Sundaram reaches Chennai and goes to Sekar's house. However, unknown to anyone, Sekar is a manipulative and sinister man. He plans to steal the money for himself. He contacts Ekambaram and tells him that Sundaram never arrived and he is yet to get the idol, implying that Sundaram ran away with it. Worried, Ekambaram comes to Chennai in search of his friend. Sekar, who still has Sundaram in his house, steals the latter's phone and gets rid of it. He makes his own deal with the pawn shop owner and gets 2 crores in advance for the idol. The remaining 3 crores will be given upon handing over the idol in person. Sundaram, believing that Sekar is a good man, continues to stay in his house. Sekar then finds out that Ekambaram is on his way to Chennai. Knowing that he will be killed if Ekambaram finds out his plans, he decides to get rid of Sundaram.

After asking his wife and children to leave the city for a few days, he talks to Sundaram and asks him if he can take care of the money or he needs someone to be sent with him. By now, Sundaram realizes that Sekar wants to kill him and steal the money for himself. Sundaram narrates a story. He tells Sekar that Sundaram was an orphan and he was brought up by Ekambaram and they have been the closest of friends for so long. Sekar asks Sundaram for his forgiveness as he desperately wants the money to give his wife and children a wealthy life. He then knocks Sundaram unconscious and locks him up in a room in his house.

Kathir gets a call from one of Ekambaram's henchmen, who saw the Facebook post about the bag and assumes that both father and son have been scheming all along to steal the idol. However, Ekambaram believes that there is a misunderstanding since there is no reason for Kathir to post the picture on Facebook if he plans to steal the bag. Nevertheless, the henchman orders Kathir to get the bag back to him within an hour's time and meet them at Sekar's house. Ekambaram, now at Sekar's place, questions him. Sekar pretends to be innocent and claims that Sundaram might have run away with the idol. Ekambaram replies that he has not come for the money but for his friend. Then, the pawn shop owner arrives and gives the remaining 3 crores to Sekar. Ekambaram is enraged and attacks Sekar, but Sekar manages to kill Ekambaram and his aide in an ensuing fight. With all his opponents dead, Sekar escapes with the money.

Meanwhile, Kathir comes to the hospital to get the bag back, but he comes across the man who lost it at the bus stop and concludes that he must have some connection with his father. He beats him up and makes him confess.  The man reveals everything that happened and says that Sekar killed his father and he had been roaming around with his father's remains in the bag all along. Kathir is shocked and finds the bag in the nearby trash bin. Sindhanai also sees the bag and comes to take it, still believing there is money in it. But he changes his mind when he sees Kathir crying over his father's remains.

Months later, Sekar is living a lavish lifestyle when he hears a knock on the door of his new apartment. He sees Kathir there and assumes that he must be the cab driver he had asked for and lets him in. Kathir attacks Sekar and ties him to a chair, demanding to know why he killed his father. Sekar replies that he would have killed his own father to become a billionaire and shows no sign of remorse. Sekar tells Kathir that he knows he is going to kill him and he is not afraid of it.

Kathir and Sindhanai then dispose of the suitcase in a nearby river, which has blood stains on it.  The scene then shifts to Sekar, who is lying down on a mat. As the camera pans out, Sekar is shown to be a quadriplegic, still alive but unable to do anything. His wife is heard getting into an extramarital affair on the phone, and Sekar now feels guilty for all the crimes he has committed.

Cast 

 Vidharth as Kathiresan
 Bharathiraja as Sundaram
 Delna Davis as Viji
 P. L. Thenappan as Ekambaram
 Elango Kumaravel as Sekar
 Uma as Sekar's wife
 Kalki as Sindhanai
 Krishnamoorthy as Sadhasivam
 Ganja Karuppu as Viji's brother
 Bala Singh as Viji's father
 Rama as Kathir's mother
 Semmalar Annam
 Madonne Ashwin as Bus passenger (special appearance)
 Abul Fazal
 Haseeb

Production 
Nithilan rose to fame after participating in the reality show, Nalaya Iyakkunar short film competition on Kalaignar TV. After being impressed by his work in the short film Punnagai Vaanginaal Kanner Ilavasam, actor Vidharth approached him to collaborate for a film in August 2015 and the pair subsequently decided to work on Kurangu Bommai. The director noted that he actively did not want regular actors to play typecast roles, so he selected veteran director Bharathiraja to play a pivotal role in the film, and production began during the following months. Film producer P. L. Thenappan was also signed on to play a pivotal role and shot for the film during May 2016. Actor Mammootty was brought in by the producers to release the first look poster of the film in mid-September 2016. Actor Arya and Director AR Murugadoss launched teaser and trailer respectively.

Soundtrack 

The film's music soundtrack was composed by B. Ajaneesh Loknath, while the audio rights of the film was acquired by Yuvan Shankar Raja's U1 Records. The original album was released on 4 June 2017 and featured five songs.

Release 
The film released on 1 September 2017 and received positive reviews from film critics. A critic from The Times of India wrote that the film was "a strong contender for the best Tamil film of the year", noting that "the tightly-woven plot keeps us hooked for the entire duration" and that "the fabulous performances from the entire cast draws us deep into the story". The Deccan Chronicle called the film "a breath of fresh air"m adding that "with a solid story and a very intriguing screenplay, Nithilan's perfect non-linear hyperlink narration of Kurangu Bommai has emerged as one of the best films of the year". Further positive reviews came from Sify.com, who called it "a well-made crime thriller" and The New Indian Express, who noted it was "another efficient film from Vidharth's stable", making a reference to his two previous critically acclaimed films, Kuttrame Thandanai (2016) and Oru Kidayin Karunai Manu (2017). The film performed well at the Chennai box office, with positive word-of-mouth reviews, making it have a better response than Vijay Sethupathi's Puriyatha Puthir (2017), which released on the same day. The film was later chosen to be show at the Chennai International Film Festival. Actor Arya and director AR Murugadoss released teaser and trailer respectively. Baradwaj Rangan of Film Companion wrote "Like Maanagaram earlier this year, Nithilan Swaminathan's Kurangu Bommai (Monkey Doll) comes with a caveat: you have to buy the coincidences. This film, too, is conceived as what has come to be known as "hyperlink cinema", but you could just as easily call it "leap-of-faith cinema". "

References 

2017 films
2010s Tamil-language films
2017 crime thriller films
Indian crime thriller films
2017 directorial debut films
Tamil films remade in other languages